András Dőry (29 September 1930 – September 2013) was a Hungarian boxer. He competed in the men's welterweight event at the 1956 Summer Olympics.

References

External links
 

1930 births
2013 deaths
Hungarian male boxers
Olympic boxers of Hungary
Boxers at the 1956 Summer Olympics
Sportspeople from Somogy County
Welterweight boxers